Dawgwood is a 1993 all-instrumental album by American musician David Grisman, recorded with his group David Grisman Quintet. It is the second album recorded under Grisman's own label, Acoustic Disc. Grisman's self-named "Dawg" music was well established when this album was recorded — it is influenced by traditional bluegrass, jazz, gypsy music, Latin and more. Most of the songs are composed by Grisman, the two covers being Django Reinhardt's "Bolero de Django" — a gypsy song which Matt Eakle's flute gives a more modern flavour and "Asanhado" by Jacob do Bandolim. The last piece on the album, "New Dawg´s Rag" is a song previously released on album The David Grisman Quintet, but with "updated" arrangement.

Track listing 
All songs by David Grisman unless otherwise noted.
 "Dawgwood" – 3:36
 "Dawgmatism" – 6:39
 "Jazzin'" (with Joe-Bob) – 5:33
 "Sea of Cortez" – 6:20
 "Steppin' With Stephane" – 6:42
 "Bolero de Django" (Django Reinhardt) – 5:58
 "Asanhado" (Jacob do Bandolim) – 6:17
 "New Dawg's Rag"

Personnel
David Grisman – mandolin
Rick Montgomery – guitar
Matt Eakle – flute
Jim Kerwin – bass
Joe Craven – percussion, violin

References

1993 albums
David Grisman albums
Acoustic Disc albums